The Merry Vineyard (German:Der fröhliche Weinberg) may refer to:

 , a play by Carl Zuckmayer
 The Merry Vineyard (1927 film), a German silent film
 The Merry Vineyard (1952 film), a West German film